Applying Pressure: The Off-Season Documentary is a documentary film based on creation of J. Cole's sixth studio album The Off-Season. It was released on May 10, 2021 by Dreamville on YouTube. It was directed by Dreamville Ventures' in-house director Scott Lazer, and produced by Tripp Kramer and David Peters.

Premise 
The short film is divided into four chapters; "Comfort is the Enemy", "Father Time", "The Climb Back", and "Applying Pressure". Cole shares a behind the scenes look in the studio as well as private moments during the album's creating process. The film also stars American rapper 21 Savage interviewing Cole. In the first two chapters, Cole speaks about adjusting work schedule and fighting complacency after becoming a father. In the third and fourth chapters, Cole talks about the inspiration of the album, talking about having writer's block and comparing his hip hop career to playing basketball.

Release 
On May 9, 2021, Cole released the official trailer for the documentary titled, Applying Pressure: The Off-Season, on social media. The documentary was released on May 10, distributed on Dreamville's YouTube channel. While describing the inspiration of the album, Cole said in the documentary:

Reception 
Writing for Billboard, Jordan Rose wrote about how the birth of Cole's son impacted the way he approached music. Cole reflected on advice he received from Pharrell Williams in 2011, talking about balancing studio recording sessions to a routine that allows him to spend time with his family. Rose also wrote about Cole returning to his roots after Cole returned to his college home in Queens, New York in 2016, where he lived while attending St. John's University. The author wrote about the parallels between music and basketball in his work such as The Warm Up, Friday Night Lights, and Cole World: The Sideline Story, saying "it looks like Cole is finally back in competitive form, and is getting his shot at the pros while simultaneously plotting his return to rap dominance," and "that hunger was palpable in the music, and as he describes in the documentary, he wants to reignite that feeling."

Release history

See also 
 The Off-Season

References

External links 
 on YouTube

2021 short documentary films
2021 films
J. Cole
2020s English-language films